Teesside Freeport is the largest freeport in the United Kingdom, where special arrangements apply for taxation and customs. It was launched in 2021 with support from the Tees Valley Combined Authority's Development Corporation.

The freeport covers 4,500 acres across multiple sites including Teesside International Airport, the Port of Hartlepool, Teesport and the Wilton International industrial site in Redcar.

Politicians and the media have criticised the project for a lack of transparency. The corporate structure behind the freeport includes multiple subsidiary companies of which several have local business owners Chris Musgrave and Martin Corney as directors. MPs have alleged that significant assets have been transferred to these directors without a formal tendering process as is usual for public-sector development projects in the UK.

References

Places in the Tees Valley